Tarsiiformes  are a group of primates that once ranged across Europe, northern Africa, Asia, and North America, but whose extant species are all found in the islands of Southeast Asia.  Tarsiers (family Tarsiidae) are the only living members of the infraorder; other members of Tarsiidae include the extinct Tarsius eocaenus from the Eocene, and Tarsius thailandicus from the Miocene.  Two extinct genera, Xanthorhysis  and Afrotarsius, are considered to be close relatives of the living tarsiers, and are generally classified within Tarsiiformes, with the former grouped within family Tarsiidae, and the latter listed as incertae sedis (undefined).  Omomyids are generally considered to be extinct relatives, or even ancestors, of the living tarsiers, and are often classified within Tarsiiformes.  

Other fossil primates, including Microchoeridae, Carpolestidae, and Eosimiidae, have been included in this classification, although the fossil evidence is debated.  Eosimiidae has also been classified under the infraorder Simiiformes (with monkeys and apes), and most experts now consider Eosimiidae to be stem simians. Likewise, Carpolestidae is often classified within the order Plesiadapiformes, a very close, extinct relative of primates.  

These conflicting classifications lie at the heart of the debate over early primate evolution.  Even the placement of Tarsiiformes within suborder Haplorhini, as a sister group to the simians (monkeys and apes), is still debated.

Classification
Generally accepted members of this infraorder include the living tarsiers, the extinct omomyids, two extinct fossil genera, and two extinct fossil species within the genus Tarsius. As haplorhines, they are more closely related to monkeys and apes than to the strepsirrhine primates, which include lemurs, galagos, and lorises.

 Order Primates
 Suborder Strepsirrhini: lemurs, lorises, and galagos
 Suborder Haplorhini
 Infraorder Simiiformes: monkeys and apes
 Infraorder Tarsiiformes/Omomyiformes
Archicebidae
 Family Tarsiidae: tarsiers
 Genus †Afrotarsius
 Genus †Xanthorhysis
 Genus Tarsius
 Genus Cephalopachus
 Genus ''Carlito

Footnotes

References

Tarsiers
Extant Thanetian first appearances
Taxa named by William King Gregory
Taxa described in 1915